Alexander 134A is an Indian reserve of the Alexander First Nation in Alberta. Located within the Municipal District of Greenview No. 16, it is 25 kilometres southeast of Fox Creek.

References

Indian reserves in Alberta